'60s Vibrations was a commercial-free music channel on Sirius Satellite Radio channel 6 and Dish Network channel 6006 that plays all-60’s and some early '70s music. Unlike its counterpart at XM Satellite Radio, The 60s on 6, it was not exactly decade-specific; rather, its musical focus was on the years 1964-69, a period in which the British Invasion, the Motown explosion, and other creative forces transformed the pop music landscape. SIRIUS Gold carried the early '60s playlist with the '50s music.  The playlist also included select titles from the early '70s and some from the earlier '60s. Core artists include the Beatles, the Beach Boys, the Temptations, the Rolling Stones, Diana Ross and the Supremes, Creedence Clearwater Revival, Marvin Gaye, Tommy James and the Shondells, and Simon and Garfunkel. There were daily segments devoted to British Invasion music ("Tea and Crumpets"), surf music ("Surf's Up"), and bubblegum music ("Bubblegum").

Since August 2005, '60s Vibrations had been the radio home of legendary New York deejay "Cousin Brucie" Morrow, who signed with Sirius after his former station, WCBS-FM, switched from its former, longtime oldies format to "Jack FM". He hosted two weekly shows on the channel: "Wednesdays with the Cuz" (Wednesdays 5-9 pm ET), and "Cousin Brucie's Saturday Night Party" (Saturdays 8 pm-midnight ET), playing music from the 1960s and 1970s.

The channel was replaced by XM's 60s on 6 channel effective November 12, 2008. The Cousin Brucie programming has moved to the '50s channel.

See also 
 List of Sirius Satellite Radio stations

External links 
 Sirius '60s Vibrations

Defunct radio stations in the United States
1960s-themed radio stations
Radio stations established in 2005
Radio stations disestablished in 2008